The Marine Fisheries Department (MFD) is a department of the Government of Pakistan. It is part of the Ministry of Maritime Affairs (Pakistan).

See also
 Fisheries Research and Training Institute, Lahore Pakistan

References
 Review of the state of world marine capture fisheries management. FAO Fisheries Technical Paper 488

External links
 Marine Fisheries Department

Pakistan federal departments and agencies
Pakistan
Ministry of Maritime Affairs (Pakistan)